Santiago Pampillón (1942–1966) was an Argentine student and activist. He was shot and killed by security forces during a protest in downtown Córdoba in September 1966.

Student Strike
On the night of 7 September 1966, thousands of students responded to the call for a strike, including Santiago Pampillón. The police were ordered to prevent and suppress the protest and a battle ensued, spanning more than twenty blocks from downtown. Amid the struggle, Pampillón received three shots to the head, fired at close range by a policeman. He was taken to a hospital, where he died on 12 September.

In solidarity with the student movement, the CGT of Córdoba organized a silent march that was later repressed by the police.

Implications
Santiago Pampillón was the first casualty in a long series of murders that occurred during the course of the military regime (1966-1973), among others such as Juan José Cabral, Adolfo Bello, Luis Norberto White and Silvia Filler. His death anticipated an escalation of violence that eventually led to full-fledged state terrorism in Argentina. Since then, the Argentine student movement has vindicated his name as a symbol of university activism and worker-student unity.

See also
 List of cases of police brutality in Argentina

References

1942 births
1966 deaths
History of Argentina (1955–1973)
Police misconduct in Argentina
1966 in Argentina
Deaths by firearm in Argentina
Deaths by person in Argentina
September 1966 events in South America